Mihail Mihaylov (Bulgarian: Михаил Михайлов; born 16 July 1997) is a Bulgarian footballer who plays for Botev Galabovo as a goalkeeper.

Career

Beroe
On 17 May 2014 Mihaylov was on the bench in the match against Neftochimic 3 years later, after being on the bench several times, he made his official debut for Beroe against Neftochimic.

On 4 January 2018, Mihaylov was loaned to Second League club Botev Galabovo until the end of the season. He was released by the club at the end of the 2017–18 season.

Career statistics

Club

References

External links
 

1997 births
Living people
Bulgarian footballers
Bulgaria youth international footballers
Bulgaria under-21 international footballers
PFC Beroe Stara Zagora players
FC Botev Galabovo players
FC Minyor Radnevo players
First Professional Football League (Bulgaria) players
Second Professional Football League (Bulgaria) players
Association football goalkeepers
Sportspeople from Stara Zagora